Arnold Akola Kome (born 11 September 1992) is a Cameroonian basketball player who plays for FAP Basketball and . He plays as shooting guard.

National team career
Kome plays for the Cameroonian national basketball team and has played at the AfroBasket in 2017 and 2021.

BAL career statistics

|-
| style="text-align:left;"|2021
| style="text-align:left;"|FAP
| 4 || 0 || 21.1 || .346 || .308 || .333 || 4.0 || 3.0 || 1.0 || .0 || 6.5
|-
|- class="sortbottom"
| style="text-align:center;" colspan="2"|Career
| 4 || 0 || 21.1 || .346 || .308 || .333 || 4.0 || 3.0 || 1.0 || .0 || 6.5

References

1992 births
Living people
Nzui-Manto players
Cameroonian men's basketball players
FAP Basketball players
People from Bamenda